Necyria bellona, the bellona metalmark, is a butterfly of the family Riodinidae. It is found in most of South America.

Description
Necyria bellona has a wingspan of 30–40 mm. Body is rather slender. Wings are deep black, more or less glossed, with metallic bright red spots or curved red and glossy blue bands.

Subspecies
The following subspecies are recognised:
N. b. bellona (Bolivia)
N. b. saundersii (Colombia and Ecuador) 
N. b. manco (Colombia)
N. b. juturna (Colombia)
N. b. westwoodi (Peru) 
N. b. whitelyiana (Peru)
N. b. zaneta (Ecuador)
N. b. gerhardi (Colombia) 
N. b. ahrenholzi (Peru)

References
 Necyria bellona at Markku Savela's website on Lepidoptera
 Butterflies of America

External links
 Iba.uk

Riodinini
Butterflies described in 1851
Taxa named by John O. Westwood